The Augusta Theater is a movie palace theater located in the city of Augusta, Kansas, which was built in about 1935. Designed by architect L. P. Larsen, the walls are decorated with large murals depicting classical scenes. It is significant, however, in that it was the first theater to use neon lighting exclusively. Considered to be a landmark of the Art Deco era, it became home of the Augusta Arts Council.

In 1990, the Augusta Arts Council planned to proceed with renovations including restoration of the building's historic facade.

The theater is currently being restored. So far the neon lights on the front of the building have been restored. The murals on the sides of the theater are being restored currently.

References

External links
 Augusta Theatre - Augusta Arts Council

Cinemas and movie theaters in Kansas
Theatres on the National Register of Historic Places in Kansas
Buildings and structures in Butler County, Kansas
Art Deco architecture in Kansas
Augusta, Kansas
Tourist attractions in Butler County, Kansas
National Register of Historic Places in Butler County, Kansas